The 2014 Mercure Perth Masters were held from January 2 to 5 at the Dewars Centre in Perth, Scotland as part of the 2013–14 World Curling Tour. The event was held in a triple-knockout format, and the purse for the event was £17,160, of which the winner, Logan Gray of Scotland, received £6,000. Gray defeated Sweden's Oskar Eriksson in the final with a score of 5–4.

Teams
The teams are listed as follows:

Knockout results

A event

B event

C event

Playoffs

References

External links

2014 in curling
Sport in Perth, Scotland
2014 in Scottish sport
Curling competitions in Scotland